Ralph Kottoy Yapande (born 9 February 1992) is a Central African professional footballer who plays as a midfielder for French club FC Limonest Dardilly Saint-Didier and the Central African Republic national team.

Club career
Born in Bangui, Kottoy spent his early career with Paris Saint-Germain B, Sainte-Geneviève Sports, Visé, Algarve and Larne.

Kottoy was one of three players released by Larne in January 2018 due to "a serious breach of club discipline". Later that month he signed for Carrick Rangers.

By September 2018 he was playing for Petrocub Hîncești in Moldova, and was still playing for them in October 2018.

In February 2019 he signed a one-year contract with Finnish club KTP. On 2 June 2019, it was announced, that his contract had been terminated by mutual consent after playing only 10 games.

In September 2019 he signed for French club US Granville. After three seasons with the club, he signed for FC Limonest Dardilly Saint-Didier in August 2022.

International career
He made his international debut for Central African Republic in 2017.

References

Living people
1992 births
Association football midfielders
Central African Republic footballers
Central African Republic international footballers
Paris Saint-Germain F.C. players
Sainte-Geneviève Sports players
C.S. Visé players
Larne F.C. players
Carrick Rangers F.C. players
CS Petrocub Hîncești players
Kotkan Työväen Palloilijat players
US Granville players
Belgian Third Division players
NIFL Championship players
NIFL Premiership players
Ykkönen players
Central African Republic expatriate footballers
Central African Republic expatriate sportspeople in France
Expatriate footballers in France
Central African Republic expatriate sportspeople in Belgium
Expatriate footballers in Belgium
Central African Republic expatriate sportspeople in Portugal
Expatriate footballers in Portugal
Central African Republic expatriate sportspeople in Northern Ireland
Expatriate association footballers in Northern Ireland
Central African Republic expatriate sportspeople in Moldova
Expatriate footballers in Moldova
Central African Republic expatriate sportspeople in Finland
Expatriate footballers in Finland
FC Limonest Dardilly Saint-Didier players